Evi Nemeth (born June 7, 1940 – missing-at-sea June or July, 2013) was an engineer, author, and teacher known for her expertise in computer system administration and networks. She was the lead author of the "bibles" of system administration: UNIX System Administration Handbook (1989, 1995, 2000), Linux Administration Handbook (2002, 2006), and UNIX and Linux System Administration Handbook (2010, 2017). Evi Nemeth was known in technology circles as the matriarch of system administration.

Nemeth was best known in mathematical circles for originally identifying inadequacies in the "Diffie–Hellman problem", the basis for a large portion of modern network cryptography.

Career
Nemeth received her bachelor's degree in mathematics from Penn State in 1961 and her PhD in mathematics from the University of Waterloo, Ontario in 1971. She taught at Florida Atlantic University and the State University of New York at Utica (SUNY Tech) before joining the computer science department at the University of Colorado Boulder (CU-Boulder) in 1980. She served as manager of the college's computing facility from 1982 to 1986. She also was a visiting Associate Professor at Dartmouth College in 1990, and at UC San Diego in 1998, while on sabbatical from CU-Boulder.

While at CU-Boulder, Nemeth was well known for her undergraduate systems administration activity, in which students over the years had the opportunity to develop in-depth knowledge and skills in Unix system administration. Together with Steve Wozniak, Nemeth established the Woz scholarship program at CU-Boulder which funded inquisitive undergraduates for many years. Nemeth also had a special talent for inspiring and teaching young people. She mentored numerous middle- and high-school students, who worked with her to support computing in the college and came to be known as "the munchkins". She also mentored talented young undergraduates, taking them to national meetings where they installed networks and broadcast the meetings' sessions on the Internet on the multicast backbone. She coached the university's student programming teams in the ACM International Collegiate Programming Contest.

From 1998 to 2006, Nemeth worked with Cooperative Association for Internet Data Analysis (CAIDA) at the University of California, San Diego, on various Internet measurement and visualization projects.

Outside the United States, Nemeth helped bring Internet technology to the developing world through her involvement with programs of the Internet Society and the United Nations Development Programme.

A network guru T-shirt
from the 1980s shows OSI Model layers with additional Layer 8 as the "financial" layer, and Layer 9 as the "political" layer. The design was credited to Evi Nemeth.

Later life
After her retirement, Nemeth sailed her 40-foot sailboat Wonderland around various parts of the world, including a circuit of the Atlantic; the Panama Canal; and across the Pacific to New Zealand.

Disappearance at sea 
In late May 2013 she, along with six other people aboard the vintage yacht Niña, traveled across the Tasman Sea en route to Australia from New Zealand. On June 4, the day the last message, sent by Nemeth, was received from Niña, the Tasman Sea had 65 mile-per-hour winds and swell height reaching 26 feet. A natural disaster (e.g. a rogue wave) might have led to the disappearance of the boat. On July 5 New Zealand authorities officially ended the search for the Niña, though relatives of the crew of Niña have continued to search.

Selected publications
 Nemeth, E., Hein, T., Snyder, G., and Whaley, B., Unix and Linux System Administration Handbook, 4th edition, Prentice Hall, 2010.
 Nemeth, E., Snyder, G., Hein, T., Whaley, B., and Makin, D., Unix and Linux System Administration Handbook, 5th edition, Prentice Hall, 2017.
 
 
 Mullin, R., Nemeth, E. and Weidenhofer, N., "Will Public Key Crypto Systems Live up to Their Expectations? HEP Implementation of the Discrete Log Codebreaker", Proc. of the 1984 Intl Conf on Parallel Processing, Aug. 21–24, 1984, pp. 193–196. Selected for the best paper award for this conference.

Awards
1984—Best Paper Award, International Parallel Processing Conference, Chicago, August, 1984
1995—USENIX/LISA Lifetime Achievement Award
1999—Top 25 Women on the Web Award
2007—Distinguished Engineering Honoree at CU-Boulder
5th Annual Telluride Tech Fest Honoree
2018—NCWIT Pioneer in Tech Award

Quotes

"Early ethernet developers... objected to a roundoff error that exceeded the ARPANET's entire bandwidth, but marketing won out."

"Many people equate the word ‘daemon’ with the word ‘demon’, implying some kind of Satanic connection between Unix and the underworld. This is an egregious misunderstanding. ‘Daemon’ is actually a much older form of ‘demon’; daemons have no particular bias towards good or evil, but rather serve to help define a person's character or personality. The ancient Greeks' concept of a ‘personal daemon’ was similar to the modern concept of a ‘guardian angel’ – ‘eudaemonia’ is the state of being helped or protected by a kindly spirit. As a rule, Unix systems seem to be infested with both daemons and demons." (p. 403, USAH)

See also

List of people who disappeared mysteriously at sea
Layer 8

References

1940 births
American women academics
American computer scientists
American women computer scientists
American people of Hungarian descent
Missing people
People lost at sea
20th-century American women scientists
2010s missing person cases
20th-century American scientists
Eberly College of Science alumni
University of Waterloo alumni
University of Colorado Boulder faculty